"Siempre hace frío" (It's Always Cold) is a ranchera song written by Mexican singer-songwriter Cuco Sánchez in 1956. Sánchez first recorded it as a 45-rpm single for the Mexican record label Columbia. His recording features guitarist Antonio Bribiesca and harpist Benito Martínez. That same year Flor Silvestre sang it in the film La justicia del gavilán vengador, which was released in 1957.

Around the same time, Verónica Loyo and Amalia Mendoza recorded their own versions with the Mariachi Vargas de Tecalitlán for RCA Víctor.

Linda Ronstadt version
Linda Ronstadt recorded the song for her album Mas Canciones (1991).

Selena version

Selena's version has the title "Siempre Hace Frio" and is the first single released from the Siempre Selena album. The song was recorded in late 1994 for the soundtrack of Don Juan DeMarco (1995). Unused on the soundtrack it was then included on the album Siempre Selena. The song was a hit single. It stayed at #2 on the Hot Latin Tracks Chart for 8 weeks.

Chart performance

References

1956 singles
1956 songs
Mexican songs
Ranchera songs
Flor Silvestre songs
1996 singles
Selena songs
Spanish-language songs
Songs released posthumously
Song recordings produced by A. B. Quintanilla
1995 songs
EMI Records singles